Andre Ghaytmazeants, better known as Khosrow Khan Gorji (b. Tbilisi, 1785/6 – d. Tehran, 1857), was a eunuch of Armenian origin, who became an influential figure in Qajar Iran.

Biography 
Born as a son of a Christian Armenian priest in Tbilisi, Georgia, Khosrow's original name was Andre Ghaytmazeants, and like his father, was a Christian, which he remained until his late-teens, where he converted to Islam and assumed the name "Khosrow Khan Gorji". Even though the surname "Gorji" in Persian usually refers to a person of ethnic Georgian origin or descent, this was not the case with Khosrow Khan. During his early life, he participated in the expedition of the Russian general Pavel Tsitsianov against Iran during the Russo-Persian War of 1804-1813, as the former was attempting to conquer Irans northern territories. However, he was eventually captured by an Iranian army in 1804 near Yerevan, was castrated, and then became a eunuch of the Qajars.

On 23 February 1815, Khosrow was appointed as the governor of Gilan. During his governorship of the province, he ordered the establishment of many buildings, which still survive today in Gilan. He also had good relations with lower classes of the region, but had bad relations with the local rulers of the province. This soon resulted in a revolt in 1819, and Khosrow was shortly deprived of his governorship of the region.

Later in 1822/3, Khosrow was sent at the head of an army consisting of Bakhtiaris to conquer Mandali, a place situated between the Iranian-Ottoman borders. Khosrow successfully managed to conquer the place, and was in 1824, appointed by the Qajar shah Fath-Ali Shah Qajar as the personal vizier of the latters son, Sayf ol-Dowleh, who served as the governor of Isfahan, thus succeeding the Georgian nobleman named Yusef Khan-e Gorji. Inside the royal court, Khosrow formed an alliance with Manouchehr Khan Gorji.

Fath-Ali Shah later died in 1834, which resulted in a struggle for the Qajar throne between his two sons Ali Mirza and Mohammad Mirza. Khosrow aided Mohammad, who eventually managed to emerge victorious during the struggle, and crowned himself as the new shah of Iran, taking the dynastic name of "Mohammad Shah Qajar". Khosrow was then appointed as the governor of Isfahan as an award for his aid. On 22 October 1847, Khosrow was appointed as the governor of Kurdistan, thus succeeding Rezaqoli Khan Wali, whom he had arrested and sent to the Iranian capital Tehran. However, his governorship of Kurdistan was briefly, and lasted only one year, the same year which Mohammad Shah died.

In 1851/2 Khosrow was appointed as the governor of Qazvin, but instead sent a representative to the province, and stayed during the rest of his life in Tehran, where he died on 27 July 1857.

References

Sources 
 

1857 deaths
1780s births
Persian Armenians
Military personnel from Tbilisi
Converts to Shia Islam from Christianity
Armenian former Christians
Iranian eunuchs
Georgian people of Armenian descent
Ethnic Armenian Shia Muslims
People of the Russo-Persian Wars
Qajar governors of Isfahan
Qajar governors of Gilan
Qajar slaves